Events in the year 1932 in Spain.

Incumbents
President: Niceto Alcalá-Zamora 
President of the Council of Ministers of Spain: Manuel Azaña

Events
Radio Ourense begins transmitting in Ourense.

Births
16 February - Antonio Ordóñez, bullfighter (died 1998)
19 June - José Sanchis Grau, comic writer (died 2011)
25 September - Adolfo Suárez, politician (died 2014)

See also
List of Spanish films of the 1930s
 Sanjurjada

References

 
Years of the 20th century in Spain
1930s in Spain
Spain
Spain